The siege of Jerusalem (7 June – 15 July 1099) was waged by European forces of the First Crusade, resulting in the capture of the Holy City of Jerusalem from the Muslim Fatimid Caliphate, and laying the foundation for the Christian Kingdom of Jerusalem, which lasted almost two centuries. The capture of Jerusalem was the final major battle of the first of the Crusades to occupy the Holy Land begun in 1095. A number of eyewitness accounts of the siege were recorded, the most quoted being that from the anonymous Gesta Francorum. 

Upon the declaration of the secular state, Godfrey of Bouillon, prominent among the leaders of the crusades, was elected ruler, eschewing the title "king." The siege was followed by the mass slaughter of thousands of Muslims and Jews and the conversion of Muslim holy sites on the Temple Mount into Christian shrines.

Background
At the Council of Piacenza in 1095, Pope Urban II received envoys from Byzantine Emperor Alexios I asking Western Christians for assistance in liberating large parts of the Eastern Roman Empire from the Seljuk Turks who had conquered large parts of the region since 1070. The Seljuk Atsiz ibn Uwaq had conquered Jerusalem from the Fatimids in 1073, making the pilgrimage to Jerusalem more difficult and suppressing a revolt of the city in 1077 in bloodbath. Responding to the call, Urban gave a sermon at the Council of Clermont in November 1095 which included a rousing call to arms for the conquest of the Holy Land and the return of the Church of the Holy Sepulchre in Jerusalem to Christian hands. His appeal marked the beginning of the Crusades, a holy war for God, in which he guaranteed participants a place in heaven.

After the successful siege of Antioch in June 1098, the Crusaders remained in the area for the rest of the year. The papal legate Adhemar of Le Puy had died, and Bohemond of Taranto had claimed Antioch for himself. Baldwin of Boulogne remained in Edessa, captured earlier in 1098. There was dissent among the princes over what to do next; Raymond of Toulouse, frustrated, left Antioch to capture the fortress at Ma'arrat al-Numan in the siege of Maarat. By the end of the year, the minor knights and infantry were threatening to march to Jerusalem without them. Eventually, on January 13, 1099, Raymond began the march south, down the coast of the Mediterranean, followed by Robert of Normandy and Bohemond's nephew Tancred, who agreed to become his vassals.

On their way, the crusaders besieged Arqa but failed to capture it and abandoned the siege on May 13. Fatimids had attempted to make peace, on the condition that the crusaders did not continue towards Jerusalem, but this was ignored; Iftikhar al-Dawla, the Fatimid governor of Jerusalem, was aware of the crusaders' intentions. Therefore, he expelled all of Jerusalem's Christian inhabitants. The further march towards Jerusalem met no resistance.

Siege
The Fatimid governor Iftikhar al-Dawla prepared the city for the siege after he heard about the arrival of the Crusaders. He prepared an elite troop of 400 Egyptian cavalrymen and expelled all Eastern Christians from the city for fear of being betrayed by them (in the siege of Antioch, an Armenian man, Firouz, had helped Crusaders enter the city by opening the gates). To make the situation worse for the Crusaders, ad-Daula poisoned all the water wells in the surrounding area, and cut down all trees outside Jerusalem. On June 7, 1099, the Crusaders reached the outer fortifications of Jerusalem, which had been recaptured from the Seljuqs by the Fatimids only the year before. The city was guarded by a defensive wall stretching four kilometers long, which was three meters thick and fifteen meters high. There were five major gates each guarded by a pair of towers. The Crusaders divided themselves into two large groups: Godfrey of Bouillon, Robert of Flanders and Tancred planned to besiege from north, while Raymond of Toulouse positioned his forces to the south.

The Fatimids now had to be prepared to fight on two fronts. After taking their positions, the Crusaders launched their first attack on June 13; the main problem was that they had no access to wood for the construction of siege equipment, because all the trees had been cut down. However, Tancred had a vision of finding a stack of wood hidden in a cave, and they used it to make a ladder. A knight named Rainbold scaled the ladder to gain a foothold on the wall but was unsuccessful. Since that assault was a failure, the Crusaders retreated and did not make any attempt until they got their tools and equipment. The Crusaders faced many more difficulties such as by the lack of water, the scorching summer heat of Palestine and the shortage of food. By the end of June, word came that a Fatimid army was marching north from Egypt. The mounting pressure forced the Crusaders to act quickly.

Final assault
On 17 June 1099, the Crusaders heard about the arrival of English and Genoese ships at the port of Jaffa. The English and Genoese sailors had brought all the necessary material with them for the construction of the siege equipment. Robert of Normandy and Robert of Flanders procured timber from the nearby forests. Under the command of Guglielmo Embriaco and Gaston of Béarn, the Crusaders began the construction of their siege weapons. They constructed the finest siege equipment of the 11th century in almost three weeks. This included: two massive wheel-mounted siege towers, a battering ram with an iron-clad head, and numerous scaling ladders and a series of portable wattle screens; now they were ready to attack The Fatimids kept an eye on the preparation by the Franks and they set up their mangonels on the wall in the firing range once an assault began.

On 14 July 1099, the Crusaders launched their attack. Godfrey and his allies were positioned towards the Northern wall of Jerusalem, and their priority was to break through the outer curtain of the walls of the city. By the end of the day they penetrated the first line of defense. On the South Raymond of Toulouse's forces were met with ferocious resistance by the Fatimids. On 15 July the assault recommenced in the Northern front; Godfrey and his allies gained success and the Crusader Ludolf of Tournai was the first to mount the wall. The Franks quickly gained a foothold on the wall, and as the city's defenses collapsed, waves of panic shook the Fatimids.

Aftermath

Crusaders enter Jerusalem 
On 15 July 1099, the crusaders made their way into the city through the tower of David and began massacring large numbers of the inhabitants;  Muslims and Jews alike. The Fatimid governor of the city, Iftikhar Ad-Daulah, managed to escape. According to eyewitness accounts the streets of Jerusalem were filled with blood. How many people were killed is a matter of debate, with the figure of 70,000 given by the Muslim historian Ibn al-Athir (writing c.1200) considered to be a considerable exaggeration; 40,000 is plausible, given the city's population had been swollen by refugees fleeing the advance of the crusading army.

Massacre 
The aftermath of the siege led to the mass slaughter of thousands of Muslims and Jews which contemporaneous sources suggest was savage and widespread and to the conversion of Muslim holy sites on the Temple Mount into Christian shrines.

Atrocities committed against the inhabitants of cities taken by storm after a siege were normal in ancient and medieval warfare by both Christians and Muslims. The crusaders had already done so at Antioch, and Fatimids had done so themselves at Taormina, at Rometta, and at Tyre. However, it is speculated that the massacre of the inhabitants of Jerusalem, both Muslims and Jews, may have exceeded even these standards.

Muslims
Many Muslims sought shelter in the Al-Aqsa Mosque, the Dome of the Rock, and the Temple Mount area generally. According to the Gesta Francorum, speaking only of the Temple Mount area, "...[our men] were killing and slaying even to the Temple of Solomon, where the slaughter was so great that our men waded in blood up to their ankles..." According to Raymond of Aguilers, also writing solely of the Temple Mount area, " in the Temple and porch of Solomon men rode in blood up to their knees and bridle reins." Writing about the Temple Mount area alone, Fulcher of Chartres, who was not an eyewitness to the Jerusalem siege because he had stayed with Baldwin in Edessa at the time, says: "In this temple 10,000 were killed. Indeed, if you had been there you would have seen our feet coloured to our ankles with the blood of the slain. But what more shall I relate? None of them were left alive; neither women nor children were spared."

The eyewitness Gesta Francorum states that some people were spared. Its anonymous author wrote,"When the pagans had been overcome, our men seized great numbers, both men and women, either killing them or keeping them captive, as they wished." Later the same source writes, "[Our leaders] also ordered all the Saracen dead to be cast outside because of the great stench, since the whole city was filled with their corpses; and so the living Saracens dragged the dead before the exits of the gates and arranged them in heaps, as if they were houses. No one ever saw or heard of such slaughter of pagan people, for funeral pyres were formed from them like pyramids, and no one knows their number except God alone. But Raymond caused the Emir and the others who were with him to be conducted to Ascalon, whole and unhurt."

Another eyewitness source, Raymond of Aguilers, reports that some Muslims survived. After recounting the slaughter on the Temple Mount, he reports of some who "took refuge in the Tower of David, and, petitioning Count Raymond for protection, surrendered the Tower into his hands." These Muslims left with the Fatimid governor for Ascalon. A version of this tradition is also known to the later Muslim historian Ibn al-Athir (10, 193–95), who recounts that after the city was taken and pillaged: "A band of Muslims barricaded themselves into the Oratory of David (Mihrab Dawud) and fought on for several days. They were granted their lives in return for surrendering. The Franks honored their word and the group left by night for Ascalon." One Cairo Geniza letter also refers to some Jewish residents who left with the Fatimid governor.

Tancred claimed the Temple quarter for himself and offered protection to some of the Muslims there, but he was unable to prevent their deaths at the hands of his fellow crusaders. Additionally, the crusaders claimed the Muslim holy sites of the Dome of the Rock and the Al-Aqsa mosque as important Christian sites, and renamed them Templum Domini and Templum Salomonis, respectively. In 1141, the Templum Domini would be consecrated, and the Templum Solomonis would become the headquarters for the Knights Templar.

Albert of Aachen, who personally was not present but wrote using independent interviews conducted with survivors back in Europe, wrote that even beyond the first round of slaughter that accompanied the fall of Jerusalem, there was another round, "On the third day after the victory judgement was pronounced by the leaders and everyone seized weapons and surged forth for a wretched massacre of all the crowd of gentiles which was still left...whom they had previously spared for the sake of money and human pity". The number killed is not specified, nor is this massacre related in any other contemporary sources.

Although the crusaders killed many of the Muslim and Jewish residents, eyewitness accounts (Gesta Francorum, Raymond of Aguilers, and the Cairo Geniza documents) demonstrate that some Muslim and Jewish residents were allowed to live, as long as they left Jerusalem.

Jews

Jews had fought side-by-side with Muslim soldiers to defend the city, and as the crusaders breached the outer walls, the Jews of the city retreated to their synagogue to "prepare for death". According to the Muslim chronicle of Ibn al-Qalanisi, "The Jews assembled in their synagogue, and the Franks burned it over their heads." A contemporary Jewish communication confirms the destruction of the synagogue, though it does not corroborate that any Jews were inside it when it was burned. This letter was discovered among the Cairo Geniza collection in 1975 by historian Shelomo Dov Goitein. Historians believe that it was written just two weeks after the siege, making it "the earliest account on the conquest in any language." The letter of the Karaite elders of Ascalon from the Cairo Geniza indicates that some prominent Jews held for ransom by the crusaders were freed when the Ascalon Karaite Jewish community paid the requested sums of money.

Eastern Christians
Contrary to what is sometimes alleged, no eyewitness source refers to crusaders killing Eastern Christians in Jerusalem, and early Eastern Christian sources (Matthew of Edessa, Anna Comnena, Michael the Syrian, etc.) make no such allegation about the crusaders in Jerusalem. According to the Syriac Chronicle, all the Christians had already been expelled from Jerusalem before the crusaders arrived. Presumably this would have been done by the Fatimid governor to prevent their possible collusion with the crusaders.

The Gesta Francorum claims that on Wednesday, August 9, two and a half weeks after the siege, Peter the Hermit encouraged all the "Greek and Latin priests and clerics" to make a thanksgiving procession to the Church of the Holy Sepulchre. This indicates that some Eastern Christian clergy remained in or near Jerusalem during the siege. In November 1100, when Fulcher of Chartres personally accompanied Baldwin on a visit to Jerusalem, they were greeted by both Greek and Syrian clerics and laity (Book II, 3), indicating an Eastern Christian presence in the city a year later.

The new ruler

On 17 July, a council was held to discuss who would be crowned the king of Jerusalem. On 22 July, Godfrey of Bouillon (who played the most fundamental role in the city's conquest) was made Advocatus Sancti Sepulchri (Defender of the Holy Sepulchre) on July 22, refusing to be named king in the city where Christ had died, saying that he refused to wear a crown of gold in the city where Christ wore a crown of thorns. Raymond had refused any title at all, and Godfrey convinced him to give up the Tower of David as well. Raymond then went on a pilgrimage, and in his absence Arnulf of Chocques, whom Raymond had opposed due to his own support for Peter Bartholomew, was elected the first Latin Patriarch on August 1 (the claims of the Greek Patriarch were ignored). On August 5, Arnulf, after consulting the surviving inhabitants of the city, discovered the relic of the True Cross.

On August 12, Godfrey led an army, with the True Cross carried in the vanguard, against the Fatimid army at the Battle of Ascalon of 1099. The crusaders were successful, but following the victory, the majority of them considered their crusading vows to have been fulfilled, and all but a few hundred knights returned home. Nevertheless, their victory paved the way for the establishment of the crusader Kingdom of Jerusalem.

The siege quickly became legendary and in the 12th century it was the subject of the Chanson de Jérusalem, a major chanson de geste in the Crusade cycle.

Conclusion 
The first crusaders succeeded in their endeavor. Urban II had ignited the flame of holy war in the Council of Clermont. Many other crusades were launched through time for various reasons and motives. Jerusalem remained in Christian hands for almost a century until the crusaders were defeated by Saladin at the Battle of Hattin in 1187, and three months later, the last defenders were expelled from the city. The conquest of Jerusalem in the First Crusade has continued to reverberate through time and has ever since shaped relations among the different faith traditions of the region.

References

Sources

 Conor Kostick, The Siege of Jerusalem, London, 2009.
 Rodney Stark, God's Battalions: The Case for the Crusades, New York, 2009.
 Hans E. Mayer, The Crusades, Oxford, 1965.
 Jonathan Riley-Smith, The First Crusade and the Idea of Crusading, Philadelphia, 1999.
 Frederic Duncalf, Parallel source problems in medieval history, New York, London : Harper & Brothers, 1912. via Internet Archive. See Chapter III for background, sources and problems related to the siege of Jerusalem.
 
 
 Sir Archibald Alison, Essays, Political, Historical, and Miscellaneous – vol. II, London, 1850.
 The Siege and Capture of Jerusalem: Collected Accounts Primary sources from the Internet Medieval Sourcebook.
 Climax of the First Crusade  Detailed examanination by J. Arthur McFall originally appeared in Military History magazine.
 
 
 S.J. Allen, "An Introduction to The Crusades," University of Toronto Press, 2017

1099
11th century in the Fatimid Caliphate
1099 in Asia
11th century in Jerusalem
Battles of the First Crusade
Conflicts in 1099
Jerusalem 1099
Jerusalem 1099
11th-century massacres
Crusader–Fatimid wars